Connie Garner (born 22 May 1979) is a fitness competitor and  NABBA Miss World Fitness. She won the Miss World Fitness title in 2000.

Biography

Garner was born descendent of a Finnish Mother born and bred in Finland and a Father who is Italian French and she was raised in Canberra, Australia. She began jazz ballet dancing at 7 years old. She played water polo, netball, basketball, hockey and soccer throughout high school. She was introduced to the gym by her physical education teacher. Garner became a personal trainer and fitness instructor herself in 1993.

Her first competition was in sport aerobics in 1997, in which she won the state title. Garner then went on to compete in fitness competitions in the National Amateur Bodybuilders Association (NABBA)/World Fitness Federation (WFF) and Ms. Fitness federations. During her five years of competing, she won multiple State and Australian Miss Fitness titles, with her best win being Miss World Fitness in 2000. A World Fitness Championship Title.

Fitness success followed with media coverage. Garner appeared on the cover of For Him Magazine in 2002.  She also appeared in popular magazines such as Cosmopolitan, Ms. Fitness Magazine, Australian Ironman, Australian MuscleMag, Women in Sport, and Oxygen Magazine. Her fitness career was followed by newspapers and local news.

Garner retired from fitness competitions in 2001 to focus on education, obtaining two degrees, a Masters and Bachelors of Information Systems, both from the University of Canberra, Australia.

Garner is also a working actress and model. She appears in the 2018 movie Australia Day, she also appeared in the 2014 movie San Andreas, and in the TV series' Hoges and Mako Mermaids Garner also stars in the following TV Commercials Youi 2018, Star Casino 2018, UBet, Cenovis Vitamins, Devine Homes, Vikings Heath and Fitness Centre, Body Connection. She works in cyber security. Garner authored a chapter on success in the book Real Talk Real Women, published in 2014.

Garner's heritage is Finnish her family name is Spännäri from Kouvola Finland.

Contest history
2001 World Fitness Federation Universe - 2nd
2001 NABBA Miss Fitness Australia - 1st
2000 NABBA Miss World Fitness - 1st
2000 NABBA Miss Fitness Australia - 1st
1999 NABBA Miss Fitness Australia - 1st
1999 Ms. Fitness World - 16th
1999 NABBA Miss Fitness Australia - 2nd
1999 NABBA Miss Fitness State Titles - 1st
1998 NABBA Miss Fitness Australia - 2nd
1998 NABBA Miss Fitness State Titles - 1st
1997 NABBA Miss Fitness State Titles - 1st

See also
 List of female fitness & figure competitors
Finnish Australians

References

External links
 The National Library of Australia - collection of newspaper and magazine articles on Garner
 Garner's official site
 Garner's official Twitter page
 Garner's official Facebook page
 NABBA/WFF competition DVDs
 Book and video
 Ms. Fitness results
 Official Ms. Fitness competition videos
 Active Australia Day Ambassadors

1979 births
Living people
Sportspeople from Canberra
Fitness and figure competitors
Australian female bodybuilders
Australian people of Finnish descent
Australian people of French descent
Australian people of Italian descent